Alekos Markidis (Greek: Αλέκος Μαρκίδης; 23 January 1943 – 23 April 2020) was a Cypriot attorney and politician. Born in Nicosia, Markides studied law in Athens in 1966. He was elected a member of the Cypriot Parliament, in 1985, serving until 1995. He served as Attorney General of Cyprus from 1995 to 2003.

Markides died on April 23, 2020 at the age of 77.

References

1943 births
2020 deaths
Attorneys-General of Cyprus
Members of the House of Representatives (Cyprus)
People from Nicosia